Robert Wiesław Ambroziewicz (born 18 February 1969 in Siedlce) is a Polish politician. He was elected to the Sejm on 25 September 2005, getting 9943 votes in 18 Siedlce district as a candidate from the Civic Platform list.

See also
Members of Polish Sejm 2005-2007

References

1969 births
Living people
People from Siedlce
Members of the Polish Sejm 2005–2007
Civic Platform politicians